Mitarai Dam  is a rockfill dam located in Kagoshima Prefecture in Japan. The dam is used for flood control. The catchment area of the dam is 6.6 km2. The dam impounds about 8  ha of land when full and can store 1180 thousand cubic meters of water. The construction of the dam was started on 1971 and completed in 1982.

See also
List of dams in Japan

References

Dams in Kagoshima Prefecture